Interlaken is a royalty-free interconnect protocol.

It was invented by Cisco Systems and Cortina Systems in 2006, optimized for high-bandwidth and reliable packet transfers. It builds on the channelization and per channel flow control features of SPI-4.2, while reducing the number of integrated circuit (chip) I/O pins by using high speed SerDes technology. Bundles of serial links create a logical connection between components with multiple channels, backpressure capability, and data-integrity protection to boost the performance of communications equipment. Interlaken manages speeds of up to 6 Gbit/s per pin (lane) and large numbers of lanes can form an Interlaken interface. It was designed to handle high-speed (10 Gigabit Ethernet, 100 Gigabit Ethernet and beyond) computer network connections. 

An alliance was formed in 2007.

Xilinx and Intel have both developed FPGAs that have Interlaken hard IP built in.

References

External links 
 Interlaken White Paper 2007
 Altera, Sarance Technologies and Cortina Systems Join Forces on First Interlaken Protocol IP Core for FPGAs
 SLE Introduces Interlaken Interconnect Protocol IP Core
 Open-Silicon Interlaken IP
 EE Times - Open-Silicon updates 'Interlaken' IP core
 Open-Silicon Enhances its Interlaken IP Core For Very High-Speed Chip-to-Chip Serial Interfaces
 Open-Silicon Secures 20th Interlaken IP License
 Open-Silicon’s Interlaken IP Core Chosen for ALAXALA’s Advanced Networking Infrastructure Device
 Open-Silicon’s Configurable Interlaken IP Core Delivers High-Performance Chip to Chip Interface for Networking Products at 28nm Process Node
 Open-Silicon Unveils Interlaken IP Core with 600 Gbps Chip-to-Chip Interface Support for Networking, Storage and High-Performance Computing Products
 Open-Silicon’s Interlaken IP Core Selected for Netronome’s Next-Generation Flow Processors
Cisco protocols